Mark DeSantis (born June 16, 1959) is an American tech entrepreneur and CEO of Bloomfield Robotics and an adviser to MIR Ventures in Palo Alto. He was CEO and cofounder of RoadBotics, an AI-based product that monitors and manages roadway infrastructure. Prior to that, he cofounded and was Executive Chairman of kWantix, an energy hedge fund and cofounded and was CEO of kWantera, a GE Ventures backed energy predictive analytics company. Previously, Mark was CEO of Think Through Learning, a venture-backed online tutoring company and US Managing Director of ANGLE Technology, PLC, a UK-based venture capital firm and consultancy. Mark co-founded and serves as a director to several other venture-backed tech firms. He currently lives in Pittsburgh, Pennsylvania, and was also a Republican mayoral candidate in the 2007 Pittsburgh election.

DeSantis was previously the Director of Government Relations for Texas Instruments, Inc. in Washington DC. He served in a number of policy positions in the Federal government including serving as a Senior Policy Analyst in both The White House Office of Science and Technology Policy and the U.S. Department of Commerce in the first Bush Administration. He was also on the staff of the late U.S. Senator John Heinz and before that he was a management consultant with Booz Allen Hamilton.

DeSantis headed a GOP-led group called "Citizens for Democratic Reform" that supported the elimination of Allegheny County row offices. In May 2005, this effort succeeded in reducing the number of row offices from 10 to 4.

Mark is currently an adjunct professor at both the Carnegie Mellon College of Engineering and Heinz College at Carnegie Mellon University and has lectured at Princeton University and Dartmouth College. He was previously an adjunct professor at the University of Maryland. Mark holds a BA and MBA from the University of Dayton, an MS in Technology Management from The American University and a PhD in Public Policy the Schar School of Policy and Government at George Mason University. He is a board member of the Regional Industrial Development Corporation and Allies for Children. 

In 2007, DeSantis ran for Mayor of Pittsburgh against Luke Ravenstahl. In 2009 DeSantis was selected as Pittsburgh's "Entrepreneur of the Year".

Awards and honors

References

External links
DeSantis for Mayor Website

American consultants
Living people
Booz Allen Hamilton people
Carnegie Mellon University faculty
Pennsylvania Republicans
1959 births
University of Dayton alumni
20th-century American businesspeople
21st-century American businesspeople